In common law systems, the peremptory pleas (pleas in bar) are defensive pleas that set out special reasons for which a trial cannot proceed; they serve to bar the case entirely.  Pleas in bar may be used in civil or criminal cases; they address the substantial merits of the case.

Criminal
In a criminal case, the peremptory pleas are the plea of autrefois convict, the plea of autrefois acquit, and the plea of pardon. The former two refer to cases of double jeopardy.

A plea of "autrefois convict" (Law French for "previously convicted") is one in which the defendant claims to have been previously convicted of the same offence and that he or she therefore cannot be tried for it again. In the instance where a defendant has been summonsed to both criminal and civil proceedings, a plea of autrefois convict is essentially an application to 'merge' proceedings, giving rise to res judicata or a cause of action estoppel in civil proceedings.

A plea of "autrefois acquit" is one in which the defendant claims to have been previously acquitted for the same offence and thus should not be tried again. The plea of autrefois acquit is a form of estoppel by which the state cannot reassert the guilt of the accused after they have been acquitted. The plea prevents inconsistent decisions and the reopening of litigation.

The limitations of these pleas have been circumscribed by various legal cases and appeals. In England, Wales and Northern Ireland, significant changes were made by the Criminal Justice Act 2003, by which an acquittal on a serious charge can be quashed and a retrial ordered, if there is "new and compelling evidence" against the acquitted person.

Civil
In a civil case, a plea in bar alleges that circumstances exist that serve to block and defeat the plaintiff's case absolutely and entirely.  Pleas in bar can include accord and satisfaction or the running of the statute of limitations.  A special plea in bar advances new matter, while a general plea in bar denies some material allegation in the complaint.

References 

Criminal procedure
Legal defenses
Legal terminology
Pleas